The Death Valley Suite is a short symphonic suite written by Ferde Grofé in 1949, depicting the westward travels of pioneers through the 'harsh lands' of Death Valley in California. Grofe was commissioned by the Death Valley 49ers, a non profit organization devoted to preserving the pioneering and mining history of the Death Valley region (consisting of Death Valley National Park and surrounding area). The composition and music was part of a pageant celebrating the 100th anniversary of the 49ers who came by way of Death Valley in search of gold and other riches and celebration of the California state centennial (1850-1950).

The original performance was conducted by Grofe with the Hollywood Bowl Symphony on December 3, 1949 in the Desolation Canyon area of Death Valley National Monument (now Death Valley National Park). The music was used in the background as a procession of covered wagons entered the area. Actor James Stewart narrated the pageant celebration. The 1949 pageant was attended by 65,000 people.

The movements are titled:

I. Funeral Mountains – a strange atonal movement in 5/4 time
II. '49er Emigrant Train – features colorful musical depictions of an Indian attack and a wagon train
III. Desert Water Hole – a medley mixing Oh! Susannah and the main theme of the piece.
IV. Sand Storm – another atonal movement featuring a wind machine with a final coda recapitulating the main dramatic theme.

The total length is 17 minutes and 11 seconds.

References

External links 

Ferde Grofé was commissioned by the California State Centennial Commission and the Death Valley '49ers to write the suite for the 1949 California Centennial Pageant. Background on history, pageant pictures, and pageant advertising can be seen at the following links:
 Death Valley Suite: Desert Water Hole – Ferde Grofe's Desert Water Hole composition for orchestra, his biography, and background on the Death Valley 49ers Pageant of 1949
 1949 Death Valley Centennial Celebration (Adobe Flash Player required) – The 1949 Pageant Guide and its conception

Suites by Ferde Grofé
Compositions for symphony orchestra
1952 compositions
Death Valley
Orchestral suites